Helicostylis tomentosa is a species of plant in the family Moraceae. It is native to Brazil, Colombia, French Guiana, Guyana, Peru, and Suriname.

References

tomentosa
Least concern plants
Trees of Peru
Taxonomy articles created by Polbot
Taxa named by Eduard Friedrich Poeppig